The SNCF Class Z 26500 and Z 24500 are a series of electric multiple unit (EMU) trains with bi-level carriages, derived from the Coradia Duplex type of Alstom. They are also known as TER 2N NG from their use on regional TER services, bi-level design (2N), and, by replacing the SNCF Class Z 23500, status as a "new generation" (NG) model. The first order from SNCF, commissioned by the French regions, was launched in 2000, the last in 2009, for deliveries that lasted from 2004 to 2010.

SNCF distinguishes between the Z 24500 series with two or three cars, and Z 26500 series with four or five cars. Each car is powered by a twin-engine (850 kW per bogie).

The national railway company of Luxembourg (CFL) joined several orders from SNCF to buy 22 trains for its network, known as CFL Class 2200.

The SJ X40 series of the Swedish railways is also a version of the Z 24500 with features specific to the Swedish climate and network, the 43 trains are the first 100% bi-level trains used in Sweden.

History

The success of the SNCF Class Z 23500 first generation two-level TER (TER 2N), as well as the significant need to renew the TER rolling stock, lead SNCF and the manufacturers to define a successor, but of an entirely new design. It also needed to offer a variety of passenger areas and be subject to enhanced passive safety, meeting the latest regulations in force. Alstom used its Coradia platform to offer new equipment, a full-scale model of which was assembled in 2002 and then presented to the public and communities to validate the choices of interior fittings.

A first contract of 629 carriages forming 72 trainsets of different configurations was issued in November 2000 on behalf of six regions: Picardie (eight 5-car trains), Provence-Alpes-Côte d'Azur (ten 4-car trains), Centre (seven 4-car trains), Nord-Pas-de-Calais (sixteen 3-car trains), Lorraine (fifteen 3-car trains), Rhône-Alpes (eleven 2-car trains). In addition, the Luxembourg railways (CFL) acquired twelve 3-car trainsets, intended to be pooled with those of the neighboring Lorraine region.

Originally, there were eleven two-car train Z 24500s that the Rhône-Alpes region had purchased in 2000, during the first order. In April 2003, eleven intermediate carriages were ordered to increase these sets from two to three car. The Rhône-Alpes region was the only one to have ordered TER 2N NG with two cars, there are none today.

Ten successive amendments, signed between April 2003 and January 2009, allowed regions to complete their stock, or new regions to place orders; they also allow the Rhône-Alpes region to order intermediate boxes in order to form only 3-car train elements instead of the 2-car train initially planned. Only the Brittany region, initially interested, did not follow up. These amendments brought the total of orders to 791 carriages forming 233 trainsets, with two carriages being ordered by CFL in order to reform a complete train set after the Zoufftgen rail accident in October 2006.

Design

The TER 2N NG trains were named by SNCF according to their configuration: Z 24500 for the two and three car trainsets and Z 26500 for the four and five car sets. Their Luxembourg counterparts have been named 2200 series.

All these elements are identical . They can travel in multiple with the first generation Z 23500 TER 2N trains.

Gallery

References

Z 24500
Electric multiple units of France
Alstom Coradia Duplex
25 kV AC multiple units
1500 V DC multiple units of France